Ray J. Quiñones Vázquez (born 15 June 1958 in Santa Isabel, Puerto Rico) is a retired Puerto Rican long jumper.

He won the Central American and Caribbean Championships in 1979 and 1987, the latter in a career best jump of 8.01 metres. He competed at the 1987 World Championships without reaching the final. He also competed in the men's long jump at the 1988 Summer Olympics.

He holds a bachelor's degree in pedagogy with a concentration in physical education from the University of Puerto Rico at Mayagüez and a master's degree in athlete training from the University of Turabo.

Was athletic director at the University of Puerto Rico at Mayagüez.

Ray Quiñones was nominated Secretary of Sports and Recreation of Puerto Rico by governor Pedro Pierluisi.

References

External links

1958 births
Living people
People from Santa Isabel, Puerto Rico
Puerto Rican male long jumpers
Puerto Rican sports executives and administrators
Athletes (track and field) at the 1987 Pan American Games
Athletes (track and field) at the 1988 Summer Olympics
Olympic track and field athletes of Puerto Rico
Secretaries of Sports and Recreation of Puerto Rico
University of Puerto Rico at Mayagüez people
Pan American Games competitors for Puerto Rico